The 2006 European Grand Prix (formally the 2006 Formula 1 Grand Prix of Europe)  was a Formula One motor race held at the Nürburgring in Nürburg, Germany on 7 May 2006.  
The 60-lap race was the fifth round of the 2006 Formula One season. It was won by Ferrari driver Michael Schumacher who took his second victory of the season. Polesitter Fernando Alonso finished in second position for the Renault team, whilst the second Ferrari of Felipe Massa achieved his first podium finish of the season with third place. 

Franck Montagny made his Formula One début, becoming the first French F1 driver since Olivier Panis at the 2004 Japanese Grand Prix.

Report

Friday drivers
The bottom 6 teams in the 2005 Constructors' Championship and Super Aguri were entitled to run a third car in free practice on Friday. These drivers drove on Friday but did not compete in qualifying or the race.

Franck Montagny was originally scheduled to act as the third driver for Super Aguri, but was promoted to a race seat after team driver Yuji Ide had his FIA Super License revoked for erratic driving in prior races that season. Ide was set to act as Super Aguri's third driver for this race, according to the team, until the revocation came down. The license revocation meant Ide could not participate in Formula One.

Qualifying
The qualifying session was affected by a red flag situation appearing on the timing monitors with 3½ minutes left. Unfortunately, this was due to a software glitch in the timing system, and the session was quickly restarted. Christian Klien felt that he lost out through it, having abandoned a lap thinking it would not count. Initially Jacques Villeneuve was outside the top 16, however the time for his lap (which he continued on during the red flag) was later recalled and placed him 7th in the session.

Classification

Qualifying

Notes
  – Mark Webber and Nico Rosberg both had their engines changed, and were both dropped ten places on the grid on Sunday. They started the race in 19th and 22nd places respectively.
  – Jacques Villeneuve originally qualified 8th with a time of 1:31.542, but his fastest three laps from the third qualifying session were deleted due to blocking the Renault of Giancarlo Fisichella.

Race

Championship standings after the race 

Drivers' Championship standings

Constructors' Championship standings

 Note: Only the top five positions are included for both sets of standings.

See also 
 2006 European GP2 Series round

References

External links 

 Detailed European Grand Prix results

European Grand Prix
European Grand Prix
European Grand Prix
Sport in Rhineland-Palatinate
May 2006 sports events in Europe